Depths is the fourth studio album by American musical duo Windy & Carl. It was released on March 23, 1998 by the record label Kranky.

Critical reception

Pitchfork ranked Depths as the 36th best ambient album of all time in 2016; in an accompanying essay, Mark Richardson cited it as "a peak" in Windy & Carl's "run of classic drone records" on the Kranky label. Two years later, Pitchfork listed Depths as the 49th best album of 1998.

Track listing

Personnel
Credits are adapted from the album's liner notes.

 Windy & Carl (Windy Weber and Carl Hultgren) – music
 Jody Helme – front cover and inside back cover photography
 Brenda Markovich – back cover photography
 Eric Pieti – inside photography

References

External links
 

1998 albums
Windy & Carl albums
Kranky albums